Mark Gepp is a former Australian politician. He was a Labor member of the Victorian Legislative Council for Northern Victoria since June 2017, when he was appointed to a casual vacancy following Steve Herbert's resignation. He retired at the 2022 state election.

Gepp worked for the Financial Sector Union before becoming an emergency services advisor to then-state minister Jane Garrett before his preselection.

Gepp completed a Graduate Certificate at Deakin University in 2009.

References

Year of birth missing (living people)
Living people
Australian Labor Party members of the Parliament of Victoria
Members of the Victorian Legislative Council
21st-century Australian politicians
Deakin University alumni